Albert Sammt (24 April 1889 in Niederstetten – 21 June 1982 in Niederstetten) was a German commander of Zeppelin-airships.
In 1919, he was helmsman on the [[List of Zeppelins#Zeppelins constructed after World War I|LZ 120 Bodensee']]. He was the elevator helmsman (Höhensteuermann) of the Zeppelin LZ 126 - USS Los Angeles on its transatlantic flight in 1924.

Sammt was the first officer on the May, 1937 flight from Germany to Lakehurst, NJ of the LZ 129 Hindenburg which ended with the Hindenburg disaster during which he was seriously burned.

After the disaster, Sammt became the commander of the  LZ 130 Graf Zeppelin, flying its spy flight in August 1939 and its last flight before it was dismantled. His home town of Niederstetten made him an "honoured citizen" (Ehrenbürger''); the Albert-Sammt-Museum is situated there.

Notes and references

Further reading 
Sammt, Albert et al.  Mein Leben für den Zeppelin. 2nd ed. Wahlwies: Pestalozzi-Kinderdorf, 1989. . (pp. 167–168, extract (in German) covering LZ 130's spying trip from 2 to 4 August 1939).
Faces of the Hindenburg: Albert Sammt

1889 births
1982 deaths
German airship aviators
LZ 129 Hindenburg